Lisa Daniely (born Mary Elizabeth Bodington; 4 June 1929 – 24 January 2014) was a British film and television actress.

Life and career
Born in Reading, Berkshire, to an English solicitor father and a French mother, she was educated in Paris and studied at the Sarah Bernhardt Theatre.

She made her film debut at the age of 21, in the title role of Lilli Marlene (1950), whilst in Hindle Wakes (1952) she played the part of mill worker Jenny Hawthorn. In Tiger by the Tail (1955) she played opposite Larry Parks, and later appeared in the horror film Curse of Simba (1965), but appeared more regularly on television. In the ITC series The Invisible Man (1958 TV series), loosely based on H. G. Wells' novel, she played Diane Brady.

Her other appearances in various TV programmes include The Saint, Danger Man, Doctor Who, Strange Report, The Protectors, The First Churchills (as Queen Mary II), Van Der Valk and The Adventures of Sherlock Holmes. She portrayed Queen Elizabeth II in the TV film Princess In Love (1996). In 2007, she provided background commentary to several episodes of The Invisible Man (1958 TV series) released by Network DVD.

Personal life and death
Lisa Daniely was married to actor Grey Blake from 1952 until his death in 1971. The couple had no children. Daniely died aged 84 on 24 January 2014, from undisclosed causes. She was survived by a stepson, Sean Blake, as well as a niece and two nephews.

Selected filmographyLili Marlene (1950) title roleHindle Wakes (1952)Operation Diplomat (1953)Tiger by the Tail (1955)The Man in the Road (1957)The Vicious Circle (1957)Danger Tomorrow (1960)Scotland Yard - The Last Train (1960)The Middle Course (1961)Curse of Simba (1965)Stranger in the House (1967)Sherlock Holmes - The Crooked Man (1984)Souvenir (1989)Goldeneye'' (1989) as Wren Captain

References

External links

Obituary, thestage.co.uk; accessed 23 April 2014.

1929 births
2014 deaths
People from Reading, Berkshire
English people of French descent
English television actresses
English film actresses
Place of death missing